Chilli chicken is a popular Indo-Chinese dish of chicken of Hakka Chinese heritage. In India, this may include a variety of dry chicken preparations. Though mainly boneless chicken is used in this dish, some people also use bone-in chicken too.

Recipes
Chilli chicken comes in several variations with differences in spices and seasoning, as well as its "sauce" and "dry" variants with differences in their quantity of sauce or gravy. The South Asian contributions of this dish are in the spices used, while the Hakka contributions include the sweet and savoury flavours along with the Chinese cooking techniques used in its preparation.

Numerous recipes exist for the dish of the same name depending on the restaurateur, including: 
Green chilli chicken.
Tangrai chilli chicken.
Chinese chilli chicken.
Bengal chilli chicken.

See also

 Chili shrimp
 Laziji, similar dish in authentic Sichuan cuisine in China
 Indian Chinese cuisine
 List of chicken dishes

References

Indian chicken dishes
Pakistani chicken dishes
Indo-Caribbean cuisine